Chemicon may refer to:
 Chemicon, a biotechnology company acquired by Merck Millipore
 Chemi-con, a Japanese manufacturer of electrical components